Shawn Nicole Thierry (born August 6, 1969) is an American politician. She is a Democratic member of the Texas House of Representatives, representing the 146th District. She won the November 2016 general election and was sworn into office on January 10, 2017. Thierry was an unsuccessful candidate for the 57th Civil District Court in 2010.

References

External links
 Campaign website
 State legislative page
 Shawn Thierry at the Texas Tribune

Living people
Democratic Party members of the Texas House of Representatives
21st-century American politicians
Texas lawyers
Howard University alumni
Thurgood Marshall School of Law alumni
1969 births